The 1966–67 Divizia A was the forty-ninth season of Divizia A, the top-level football league of Romania.

Teams

League table

Results

Top goalscorers

Champion squad

See also 

 1966–67 Divizia B

References

Liga I seasons
Romania
1966–67 in Romanian football